Kateřina Bužková (born 19 March 1996) is a Czech football midfielder, currently playing for Slovan Liberec in the Czech Women's First League.

She is a member of the Czech national team.

References

External links
 
 
 

1996 births
Living people
Czech women's footballers
Sportspeople from Zlín
Women's association football midfielders
AC Sparta Praha (women) players
Czech Republic women's international footballers
Czech Women's First League players
FC Slovan Liberec players